Mayama may refer to:

People 
 Akihiro Mayama (born 1988), Japanese actor
 Miko Mayama (born 1939), American actress
 Rika Mayama (born 1996), Japanese idol singer (Shiritsu Ebisu Chugaku), voice actress

Places 
 Mayama District, a district in the Pool Region of south-eastern Republic of the Congo